Whitrigg was a railway station on the Bowness Moss which served Whitrigg, a hamlet in Cumbria on the English side of the Solway Firth. The station opened on 8 August 1870 by the Caledonian Railway on a line constructed from the Caledonian Railway Main Line at Kirtlebridge across the Glasgow South Western Line, then forming the Solway Junction Railway over the Solway Viaduct to Brayton. The line opened in 1869, but freight had run from 13 September 1869.

History 
Whitrigg station was opened by the Solway Junction Railway, then part of the Caledonian Railway. At first the station was a 'flag' station or request stop with passengers wishing to alight informing the guard at Abbey Junction or Bowness, depending on their direction of travel. The gateman likewise signalled if a train was to stop. From 1 January 1873 a crossing keeper had been appointed and the level crossing itself signalled. North of the station was a goods siding, worked by a frame which was controlled by train tablet for the section Bowness and Kirkbride Junction.

The passenger service was never very well patronised and reduced to being just one carriage at the front of an occasional goods train and in September 1917 this was suspended, but was reinstated in 1920. Passenger services were finally withdrawn in 1921 and the line south of Annan over the Solway Viaduct was closed completely.

The station had one platform with a simple wooden station building. The closure of the station was directly linked to the closure of the Solway viaduct.

Micro-history
The first up goods train used to call at Whitrigg to attach livestock wagons.

The site today 
The station waiting room and platform have been demolished and a private dwelling has been built on the site.

References 
Notes

Sources
 
 
 

Further reading
 
 
 Railways of the Solway Plain

Disused railway stations in Cumbria
Former Caledonian Railway stations
Railway stations in Great Britain opened in 1870
Railway stations in Great Britain closed in 1917
Railway stations in Great Britain opened in 1920
Railway stations in Great Britain closed in 1921